James Rogers (born May 27, 1988) is a former American football cornerback. Rogers played for the Tampa Bay Buccaneers and Kansas City Chiefs of the National Football League.

Professional career

Kansas City Command
Rogers was assigned to the Kansas City Command of the Arena Football League in 2012. He played in three games with the Command.

Tampa Bay Buccaneers
Rogers was signed to the Tampa Bay Buccaneers practice squad on December 11, 2012.

Kansas City Chiefs
Rogers signed with the Kansas City Chiefs on May 14, 2013.

Hamilton Tiger-Cats
Rogers signed with the Hamilton Tiger-Cats on September 5, 2013.

External links
Tampa Bay Buccaneers bio

1988 births
Living people
American football cornerbacks
Michigan Wolverines football players
Hamilton Tiger-Cats players
Kansas City Command players
Arizona Rattlers players